Love and Courage is a 1913 American short comedy film featuring Fatty Arbuckle.

Cast
 Roscoe 'Fatty' Arbuckle
 Mabel Normand
 Ford Sterling

See also
 Fatty Arbuckle filmography

References

External links

1913 films
Silent American comedy films
1913 comedy films
1913 short films
American silent short films
American black-and-white films
Films directed by Henry Lehrman
American comedy short films
1910s American films